Jackson F. Kimball State Recreation Site is a state park in southern Oregon. The park was established in 1955, and covers  including the headwaters of the Wood River.

Recreation 

Visitors to Kimball State Recreation Site can camp or picnic and enjoy water activities like fishing, canoeing, and kayaking. A short trail connects the main campground to the Wood River’s headwaters spring site.

The park has ten primitive campsites near the headwaters lagoon. Toilet facilities are primitive and potable water is not available in the park.

There is a popular horse trail that begins at Collier Memorial State Park that leads through the forest to Kimball State Recreation Site. Riders must make a round trip from Collier State Park since there are no horse corrals at Kimball Recreation Site.

Wood River 

The headwaters of the Wood River emanate from a spring located in Kimball State Recreation Site. Wood River meanders through pine forest and agricultural land for  before flowing into Agency Lake. The park itself is forested with ponderosa and lodgepole pine with some quaking aspen.

The river offers fine fishing that can be accessed from the shore or by canoe or kayak.  Brook, brown, and rainbow trout are found in the Wood River and its tributaries.  In addition, Bureau of Land Management biologists have found native Great Basin redband trout in the river between the Kimball State Recreation Site and the confluence of Annie Creek about a mile downstream from the park.

Access 

The area in the Cascade Mountains around the park experiences cold winters with significant snowfall. Summers are generally dry with warm temperatures. However, in some years deep winter snowfalls can delay the park’s opening until June. The park usually closes in October, after the summer visitor season slacks off.

History 

In 1943, the State of Oregon purchased  near Sun Mountain to establish Sun Pass State Forest. Additional land was added to the forest in 1944, 1947, and 1948. In 1955, the Oregon Board of Forestry deeded  of Sun Pass land to the Oregon State Highway Division to create Jackson F. Kimball State Park. The park was named after Jackson F. Kimball, a district forest warden for the Klamath-Lake Forest Protective Association.  The park was officially renamed the Jackson F. Kimball State Recreation Site in 2004.

Jackson Kimball was born in Maine probably in 1874. In 1905 he began working for the Weyerhaeuser Timber Company. While he worked for Weyerhaeuser, Kimball also acted as agent or broker for the several smaller timber companies, and was a trustee of the American National Bank of Klamath Falls. He spent considerable time in Salem lobbying the Oregon Legislature on behalf of the timber industry. Kimball began his associated with the Klamath-Lake Counties Forest Fire Association, the forerunner of the Klamath Forest Protective Association, in 1908. He remained active in the association until his death in 1944.

References

External links 
 

State parks of Oregon
Parks in Klamath County, Oregon
1943 establishments in Oregon
Protected areas established in 1943